The Garrett-Bullock House is a historic Queen Anne-style house in Columbus, Georgia.  It was listed on the National Register of Historic Places in 1980.

It was owned by Joseph Garrett, owner of a Broad Street wholesale liquor-and tobacco business known as "Garrett & Sons", and became a boarding house.

The Garrett-Bullock House may have been used as a special events center for weddings and parties.

It is separately listed in the National Register and also included in the High Uptown Historic District.

References

Houses on the National Register of Historic Places in Georgia (U.S. state)
Queen Anne architecture in Georgia (U.S. state)
Houses completed in 1881
Houses completed in 1886
Houses in Columbus, Georgia
National Register of Historic Places in Muscogee County, Georgia
1881 establishments in Georgia (U.S. state)